Harry Peter Rinke (born 5 November 1981) is a former Zimbabwean cricketer who debuted for the international team against Kenya in 2005–06.

International career
Rinke made 168 runs during the four-match series, more than any other Zimbabwean batsman, his innings of 72 in the fourth match was the highest by a Zimbabwean in the series, and he was the only Zimbabwean to make more than one half-century. Rinke's medium pace also yielded three wickets during the series. His successes against Kenya saw him picked again for the 7-ODI tour of the West Indies in April and May 2006.

Rinke last played international cricket in 2006 for Zimbabwe against Sri Lanka in the 2006 ICC Champions Trophy.

Domestic career
Rinke played first class cricket for CFX Academy, Manicaland and Mashonaland before graduating to the international side, and also played five matches for Zimbabwe A against Bangladesh A during their 2003–04 tour.

After Sri Lanka match, he left Zimbabwe and since then played in the UK for Scarborough CC in the Oxbridge Yorkshire ECB County Premier League. Often he also expressed his desire to return in Zimbabwe and play for the country.

Coaching career
In October 2009, he was appointed head of the New York Cricket Academy in England. Rinke will also work as a 'full-time coach' for them. Rinke is currently linked to the Cricket Centre of Excellence at Scarborough College as Head Pro.

References

External links
 

1981 births
Living people
Sportspeople from Marondera
White Zimbabwean sportspeople
Zimbabwe One Day International cricketers
Zimbabwean cricketers
CFX Academy cricketers
Manicaland cricketers
Matabeleland cricketers